Netherworld is a shoot 'em up video game published by Hewson in 1988. It was originally developed by Jukka Tapanimäki for the Commodore 64, and original music was composed by Jori Olkkonen.

Summary
The object is to fly a small spacecraft and collect the required number of diamonds in each level. Once enough diamonds are collected, the craft must reach a teleporter to go to the next level before the time runs out. Aside from the time limit, there are various obstacles, ranging from monsters to items which can damage the craft or block the path. The ship can destroy some obstacles by shooting, sometimes turning them to diamonds as well.

The cover image, which features Tapanimäki's face, was produced from a photograph of the programmer without his knowledge and approval. The original design, depicting a dwarf at the gates of hell, had been shelved following a dispute between Hewson and the original cover artist. Tapanimäki did not see the final version produced by Hewson's local artist, Steve Weston,  until the press conference in London when the game was released.

Cheat codes published in gaming magazines that only worked in an earlier version of the code indicated that a development version of the game had leaked to pirates some six months before the release.

Reception
The Spanish magazine Microhobby awarded the game the following scores: Originality: 80% Graphics: 80% Motion: 80% Sound: 80% Difficulty: 100% Addiction: 100%

References

External links 

Netherworld at the Amiga Hall of Light
Netherworld at Atari Mania

 Netherworld , Tec Dubelin Xbox

1988 video games
Amiga games
Amstrad CPC games
Atari ST games
Commodore 64 games
DOS games
Hewson Consultants games
Single-player video games
Video games developed in Finland
ZX Spectrum games